Street Rhymes Studios is a Port Harcourt-based independent, sound recording studio founded by singer and record producer Slim Burna, after he quit working for record label Grafton Records in late 2008. The studio operates out of Burna's residential building, 10 Railway Close, in D-line. 
Notable musical acts who have used the facility include award-winning Nigerian rapper M-Trill and pop singer-songwriter Muma Gee. Others are, Bukwild Da Ikwerrian, Knowledge, DJ Joenel, Zubillionaire, Spaceman, and Young Stunna.

History
After graduating from secondary school, Slim Burna ventured into music production. Ogoni native Roarhillz Neebuen introduced him to rapper M Trill who was then signed with Grafton Records. "I got a call from Roarhillz that M-Trill wanted to see me. The next day I went over to meet M and he said he had a production job for me at Grafton, after I had agreed to work with him I was interviewed by Tony the manager and I had to let them know that I don't work alone, so I brought P Jay along and we began working there", he remembers. 
During Burna's time at Grafton Records, he assisted in the production of music for artists such as Lilyjean and Lamili. After being falsely accused of theft of company property, Burna left the job and started Street Rhymes. By the end of 2008, he had already begun making beats and creating music in his own studio.

Albums recorded at Street Rhymes
 Slim Burna's debut, I'm on Fire, released in 2013 was recorded and mixed at Street Rhymes Studios by Burna himself and his co-producer P-Jaydino.  The mixtape has received over 50,000 downloads worldwide and has been named the most successful mixtape ever released by a Port Harcourt-based artist.

Songs recorded at Street Rhymes
 "Oyoyo" (2009)
 "Oya Na" (2012)

References

External links

Recording studios in Nigeria
Companies based in Port Harcourt
Mass media companies established in 2008
Privately held companies of Nigeria
D-line, Port Harcourt
Buildings and structures in Port Harcourt
Port Harcourt hip hop
2008 establishments in Nigeria